Daniel Davies (7 November 1863 - 23 August 1928) was the Anglican Bishop of Bangor from 1925 until his death.

Davies was educated at  St John's College, Cambridge. He held curacies at Conway and Bangor before becoming Vicar Choral of St Asaph Cathedral and then the incumbent at Brymbo. He was chairman of the executive committee of the National Eisteddfod of Wales in 1912, by which time he was a residential canon at St Asaph Cathedral, a post he held until his ordination as a bishop.

References

1863 births
Alumni of St John's College, Cambridge
Bishops of Bangor
20th-century bishops of the Church in Wales
1928 deaths